Vasireddy Sri Krishna shortly V.S.Krishna (8 October 1902 – 16 February 1961), was Vice Chancellor of Andhra University in Visakhapatnam, India.

He was born to Sriramulu and Veeramma at Pedapalem village in Tenali taluq in Andhra Pradesh, India.

He studied in Oxford University, London in Economics and obtained his B.A. in 1929.

He joined Andhra University in 1932 as Lecturer in Economics. He did his Ph.D. from Vienna University in Gold Standardization. Later he joined back in the university as Warden, Registrar and head of newly established Economics department.

In 1949, he was elected as Vice chancellor by the university senate. He held this position for 11 years till 1961 and worked hard in the various developmental activities of the university. He developed the university library which was later named as Dr. V. S. Krisha Library.

In 1957, he was elected as president of Inter University Board of India. He was the chairman of University Grants Commission (India) in 1961 and died during the same period.

References

Telugu people
1961 deaths
1902 births
Vice-Chancellors of the Andhra University